Landry Tomb is an historic burial vault located in the cemetery of the Ascension of Our Lord Catholic Church in Donaldsonville, Louisiana. The two stage granite monument, containing 24 vaults, was built in 1845 and its design is attributed to James H. Dakin, an architect whose work included the Old Louisiana State Capitol building.

Landry family members entombed or interred here include U.S. Representative Joseph Aristide Landry (1817–1881).

The tomb was placed on the National Register of Historic Places on August 11, 1982.

Others interred in the cemetery of the Ascension of Our Lord Catholic Church include James Patrick Major, Ralph Falsetta, Duncan Farrar Kenner and Allen Thomas.

See also
 National Register of Historic Places listings in Ascension Parish, Louisiana

References

External links
 
 

Tombs in the United States
Cemeteries on the National Register of Historic Places in Louisiana
Buildings and structures in Ascension Parish, Louisiana
Buildings and structures completed in 1845
Donaldsonville, Louisiana
National Register of Historic Places in Ascension Parish, Louisiana
1845 establishments in Louisiana